The 2017 F2000 Championship Series season is the twelfth season of competition for the series.

Race calendar and results

Championship standings

References

External links
 Official Series Website

F2000 Championship Series
F2000 Championship Series seasons
2017 in formula racing